The finals and the qualifying heats of the Men's 200 metres Breaststroke event at the 1997 FINA Short Course World Championships were held on the third day of the competition, on Saturday 20 April 1997 in Gothenburg, Sweden.

Finals

See also
1996 Men's Olympic Games 200m Breaststroke
1997 Men's European LC Championships 200m Breaststroke

References
 Results

B